The Johnson Hall–Deseret Mercantile Building is a side-by-side pair of buildings in Grantsville, Utah, United States. It has also been known as the Johnson Building, the Grantsville Bank, the Grantsville Post Office, and the Grantsville Drugstore. It was listed on the National Register of Historic Places in 2006.

Description
The buildings, which are located at 4 West Main Street (Utah State Route 138), were constructed in c.1890 and c.1898, and were connected together in 1953.

The building has significant historical associations with multiple periods of Grantsville's history, and "is architecturally significant for a unity of design (although the two buildings were constructed several years apart) and rich detail in the brickwork. The building is an excellent example of Victorian Eclectic ornamentation in a turn-of-the-century commercial block."  It was built by contractor/mason James Jensen, a mason and contractor.

See also

 National Register of Historic Places listings in Tooele County, Utah

References

External links

Commercial buildings on the National Register of Historic Places in Utah
Commercial buildings completed in 1890
Buildings and structures in Tooele County, Utah
National Register of Historic Places in Tooele County, Utah